Kang Chan-hee (강찬희; born January 17, 2000), also known by his stage name Chani, is a South Korean singer and actor. He began his career as a child actor, in the television dramas Listen to My Heart (2011), The Innocent Man (2012), The Queen's Classroom (2013), interactive drama Click Your Heart (2016), crime drama Signal (2016), and high-rated drama Sky Castle (2018). In 2015, he was introduced as one of the first members of NEOZ, which was a first group of FNC Entertainment's pre-debut team Neoz School. He debuted in October 2016 with the group name SF9 and the single "Fanfare".

Kang's best-known acting role was for his part in Sky Castle, where he played the role of Hwang Woo-joo, a smart and sweet high school student who lives in a high-end residential area called Sky Castle.

Discography

Other releases

Filmography

Film

Television series

Web series

Television shows

Hosting

Awards and nominations

Notes

References

External links 

 
 

2000 births
Living people
People from Daejeon
K-pop singers
SF9 (band) members
FNC Entertainment artists
South Korean male film actors
South Korean male television actors
South Korean male child actors
School of Performing Arts Seoul alumni
South Korean male idols
South Korean pop singers
South Korean dance music singers
South Korean male web series actors
21st-century South Korean male singers